Jacob Augustus Geissenhainer (August 28, 1839 – July 20, 1917) was an American lawyer and Democratic Party politician who represented New Jersey's 3rd congressional district in the United States House of Representatives for three terms from 1889 to 1895.

Early life and career
Geissenhainer was born in New York City and attended private schools. He graduated from Columbia College in New York City (Master of Arts, 1858), and went on to study law at Yale Law School, and New York University (Bachelor of Arts, 1860). He also attended the University of Berlin. In 1862 he was admitted to the bar, and he commenced practice in New York City. Geissenhainer married Susan Havemeyer Burkhalter, a member of the Havemeyer family.

Congress
He was elected as a Democrat to the Fifty-first, Fifty-second and Fifty-third Congresses where he served from March 4, 1889 until March 3, 1895.

He also served as chairman of the Committee on Immigration and Naturalization (Fifty-third Congress), and on the Committee on Naval Affairs (Fifty-third Congress). Geissenhainer was an unsuccessful candidate for reelection in 1894 to the Fifty-fourth Congress. After this, he resumed the practice of law.

Death
He died at Mount Pocono, Pennsylvania, and was interred in West Laurel Hill Cemetery, Bala Cynwyd, Pennsylvania.

References

External links

Jacob Augustus Geissenhainer at The Political Graveyard

1839 births
1917 deaths
Columbia College (New York) alumni
New York (state) lawyers
New York University School of Law alumni
Lawyers from New York City
Democratic Party members of the United States House of Representatives from New Jersey
Burials at West Laurel Hill Cemetery
19th-century American politicians
Politicians from New York City
19th-century American lawyers